Igino Cocchi (27 October 1827 – 18 August 1913) was an Italian geologist and paleontologist who worked at the Museum of Natural History, Florence.

Cicchi was born in Terrarossa, Val di Magra where and studied Latin and natural sciences, graduating from the University of Pisa. training under Giuseppe Meneghini, after which he travelled to England during which time he made contact with Charles Darwin. He founded the Alpine Club of Florence in 1867 and the first Italian geology journal Bollettino del Reale Comitato Geologico d’Italia.

References 
 

1827 births
1913 deaths
19th-century Italian geologists
University of Pisa alumni
People from Licciana Nardi